Madrasile Mon is a 1982 Indian Malayalam-language true crime film directed by J. Sasikumar and written by P. M. Nair. It is based on the Karikkan villa murder case of 1980. The film stars Raveendran, Mohanlal, Ravikumar, and Thampi Kannanthanam. The film was released on 20 August 1982.

Plot

Karikkanvilla murder is a criminal incident occurred at Meenthalakkara in Tiruvalla, in the south Indian state of Kerala in 1980.

Cast
Raveendran
Mohanlal
Ravikumar
Thampi Kannanthanam
K. P. Ummer
Sheela
Reena
 K. N. Bal
Alummoodan
Manavalan Joseph
Meena
Prameela

Production
Madrasile Mon is based on the Karikkan villa murder case that happened at Thiruvalla in 1980. The film was produced by Thiruvalla native Mani Malliath through the production company Ragam Movies. The title Madrasile Mon refers to the nickname of the main culprit Reny George. Police officer K. N. Bal (DSP), an investigating officer in the actual case appeared as the investigating officer in the film too. Raveendran portrayed Reni George, along with Mohanlal and Thampy Kannamthanam. The film was released two years after the incident.

Trivia

The film narrates the true story of K. C. George and his wife Rachel, who were killed in their house at Meenthalakkara, Tiruvalla. Police had no clue on this incident. As the part of investigation, they found some footprints inside the house that looked very strange. Those footprints came from shoes which were not made in India. After some questioning, the maid, Gowri told the police that her master said their son from Madras was coming there on the same day. So police started their investigation to Madras. They caught the real culprit Renny George, who was a close relative to this killed couple. Renny George along with his four other friends, all belonging to other countries were involved in this murder. Their aim was money and gold for purchasing drugs.

Renny George served his jail sentence where he continued his drug trafficking activities for a while and eventually turned a new leaf to become an evangelist. While in the prison, he fell in love with a Nurse Teena and married her. He walked out of prison on 23 June 1995 as a new man. He runs an orphanage for children whose parents are imprisoned.

Soundtrack
The music was composed by G. Devarajan and the lyrics were written by A. P. Gopalan. The soundtrack album was released on 31 December 1981.

Release
The film initially scheduled to be released on 9 April 1982 was postponed and released on 20 August 1982. After the film's release, when the main culprit Reny George was released on parole, he blackmailed producer Mani Malliath and extorted ₹60,000 from him.

References

External links
 

1982 films
1980s Malayalam-language films
Thriller films based on actual events
Films directed by J. Sasikumar